Walls is an unincorporated community in West Baton Rouge Parish, Louisiana, United States.

Notes

Unincorporated communities in West Baton Rouge Parish, Louisiana
Unincorporated communities in Louisiana